The Aboriginal Lands Act 1995 is a statute passed by the Parliament of Tasmania that came into effect on 14 November 1995. It provided for the establishment of an elected Aboriginal Land Council of Tasmania. The Council consists of eight members elected by Tasmanian indigenous people. The Act enables that land of significance to Tasmanian indigenous people is to be returned to the community and held on trust by the council.

References

Tasmania legislation
Indigenous Australians in Tasmania
1995 in Australian law
1990s in Tasmania